The Henry Adams Building, also known as the Land and Loan Office Building, is a historic building  in Algona, Iowa, United States. It was designed by Louis Sullivan in 1912.

Although it was not designed as a bank, and has never served as such, the building is nonetheless considered one of Sullivan's "Jewel Boxes," a series of banks designed and built in the Midwest between 1909 and 1919. As in the other "Jewel Boxes," Sullivan included many windows, both on the street side and in the skylight that allowed a great deal of natural light inside. The simple massing of this small, rectangular building with its clearly defined structure was typical of Sullivan's later work. The same massing and similar detailing, particularly the entrance, was used by Sullivan's former associates Purcell & Elmslie in their slightly larger Exchange State Bank in Grand Meadow, Minnesota in 1910, and it is possible that this design influenced Sullivan. (Brooks) Sullivan was assisted in the design by his draftsman, Parker Berry, who drew the perspectives.

The building was added to the National Register of Historic Places in 1998, under the name of "Land and Loan Office Building."  It is currently occupied by the Algona Chamber of Commerce.

Other Louis Sullivan "jewel boxes"
Farmers and Merchants Bank, Columbus, Wisconsin (1919)
Home Building Association Company, Newark, Ohio (1914)
Merchants' National Bank, Grinnell, Iowa (1914)
National Farmer's Bank, Owatonna, Minnesota (1908)
People's Federal Savings and Loan Association, Sidney, Ohio (1918)
Peoples Savings Bank, Cedar Rapids, Iowa (1912)
Purdue State Bank, West Lafayette, Indiana (1914)

References

Further reading
 Brooks, H. Allen, The Prairie School: Frank Lloyd Wright and His Contemporaries, University of Toronto Press, Toronto, Ontario, 1972
 Elia, Mario Manieri, Louis Henry Sullivan, Princeton Architectural Press, Princeton NY, 1996
Gebhard, David & Gerald Mansheim, Building of Iowa, Oxford University Press, New York, 1993
Twombly, Robert, Louis Sullivan: His Life and Work, Elizabeth Sifton Books - Viking, New York, 1986
Wilson, Richard Guy and Sidney K. Robinson, The Prairie School in Iowa, Iowa State University Press, Ames, Iowa, 1977

Commercial buildings completed in 1912
Commercial buildings on the National Register of Historic Places in Iowa
Louis Sullivan buildings
Buildings and structures in Kossuth County, Iowa
1912 establishments in Iowa
Art Nouveau architecture in Iowa
Art Nouveau commercial buildings
National Register of Historic Places in Kossuth County, Iowa
Algona, Iowa